People's Songs was an organization founded by Pete Seeger, Alan Lomax, Lee Hays, and others on December 31, 1945, in New York City, to "create, promote, and distribute songs of labor and the American people." The organization published a quarterly Bulletin from 1946 through 1950, featuring stories, songs and writings of People's singers members. People's Songs Bulletin served as a template for folk music magazines to come like Sing Out! and Broadside.

History
Seeger's work with the Almanac Singers and trips around the country playing banjo for Congress of Industrial Organizations (CIO) benefits and other progressive organizations in the 1940s cemented his beliefs that folk music could be an effective force for social change. He conceived creating an organization to better disseminate songs for political action to Labor and other progressive organizations around the country. These plans were put on hold as Seeger was drafted into the army during World War II. Upon his discharge from the Army in 1946, Seeger finally got a chance to realize his plans, and convened a group of interested people for a meeting in the basement of his in-laws' apartment in Greenwich Village. People's Songs' founding committee included several former members of the Almanac Singers and other notable members of the folk community in New York and included Woody Guthrie, Lee Hays, Horace Grenell, Anges "Sis" Cunningham, Burl Ives, Millard Lampell, Alan Lomax, Bess Lomax Hawes, Josh White. and Tom Glazer. Also attending the first meeting were, Jackie Gibson, Ronnie Gilbert, Irwin Silber and David Sear.  They elected Pete Seeger president and Lee Hays executive secretary and collected money to rent a small office located at 130 West 42nd Street, New York, NY, which also housed shared a radical drama group Stage for Action. Corporate counsel was Joseph R. Brodsky.
 
The organization was loosely modeled as an American version Great Britain's Workers Music Association, founded 10 years earlier than People's Songs. It  published out a weekly newsletter with songs, articles, and announcements of Hootenannies and folk dances. It served as a clearing house for progressive entertainers. There were also occasional special issues with relevant songs on an as needed basis geared for specific rallies, strike, and court cases. Soon the booking agency became an offshoot: People's Artists.

People's Songs branched out into several satellite locations in addition to the New York offices. A yearly convention was held as a place to exchange ideas and play songs. The first People's Songs convention was held in 1947 in Chicago, and there was a branch in California headed by Mario Casetta, an army friend of Seeger's from Saipan, who became a key figure in the West Coast folk and world music scene.

In its first year People's Songs met with success, but this was a trying time for the labor movements in the United States, which had a significant Communist presence since its inception. After World War II, the Communist Party of the United States became much more dogmatic than formerly, and was indifferent to the use of folk music. There was also not much call for new organizing or singing in the streets, as established unions tried to consolidate their gains. In addition, there was a conservative majority in Congress, which opposed the labor movement altogether and was adamantly committed to maintaining racial segregation in the South. Eager to reverse the social legislation of President Franklin D. Roosevelt's New Deal, it passed the Taft-Hartley act (over Harry S. Truman's veto). Some scholars believe that President Truman himself instituted loyalty oaths and mass firings, in order to preempt conservative criticism, control public opinion, and forestall any opposition to his Marshall Plan and to a military build-up from the left wing of his party. As the Red Scare gathered momentum, the House Un-American Activities Committee held hearings into supposed subversive activity in the entertainment industry. People's Songs began to falter financially. In 1948 it put all its resources into the presidential campaign of Henry A. Wallace, and when that failed everywhere but in New York City, People's Songs went bankrupt, although its booking agency, People's Artists, continued for a while. After the financial failure of People's Songs in 1948, Seeger and Silber put out an interim People's Songs newsletter and then went on to form the more durable Sing Out! magazine with a similar format.

The Newsletter

The People's Songs  was a small mimeographed magazine published quarterly from February 1946 to 1950.
The first issue of the People's Songs  was published February 1946 to a circulation of 3000 countrywide. Its musical editor was Waldemar Hille. The first issue featured a selection of seven Union songs widely ranging from traditional songs like Casey Jones, to standards by Joe Hill, to international songs from Spanish soldiers and new songs by contemporary folk musicians like Lee Hays and Woody Guthrie. This was a format the magazine would follow throughout its years of publication. The songs were numbered to maintain sequence from the first issue continuing through each issue, for example the first issue contained seven songs, and the first song in the second issue was numbered 8. People's Songs served as a template for folk music magazines to come like Sing Out and Broadside.

Contributors to People's Songs Newsletter
People's Songs contained a lot of written out sheet music, lyrics and tablature. It was an eclectic mix of traditional folk and union songs along with newly written pieces by contemporary folk musicians of the time. Some contributors include the following:

Moe Asch
Anges "Sis" Cunningham,
Tom Glazer
Woody Guthrie
Lee Hays
Waldemar Hille
Zilphia Horton
Burl Ives
Millard Lampell
Pete Seeger
Irwin Silber
Sonny Terry
Josh White

The entire backfile of People's Songs was microfilmed in the 1980s by Clearwater Publishing Inc. from Pete Seeger's personal copy, including his personal commentaries.  Clearwater Publishing (not related to the Sloop Clearwater) was acquired by Congressional Information Service in 1987, which was a subsidiary of Reed-Elsevier, an international publishing conglomerate.  In 2010 Reed-Elsevier sold all its microfilm titles, including People's Songs, Broadside magazine, and New City Songstore, a British folkmusic newsletter published by Peggy Seeger, to ProQuest/CSA.

Notes

Further reading
 Lieberman, Robbie. "My Song is My Weapon": People's Songs, American Communism, and the Politics of Culture, 1930 - 1950 Urbana: University of Illinois Press, 1989.
 The People's Song Library Collection, located at the Walter P. Reuther Library in Detroit. 1940–70, bulk 1940-55
The People's Song Library archival collection consists of songs collected by the Almanac Singers (1941–43); People's Songs, Inc. (1946–49); People's Artists, Inc. (1950–57); and Sing Out, Inc. (1958–70). Scores, songbooks, and lyrics by Aaron Copland, Woody Guthrie,  Joe Hill, Huddie ("Lead Belly") Ledbetter, Alan Lomax, Phil Ochs, Tom Paxton, Malvina Reynolds, Peggy and Pete Seeger, Josh White, and lesser-known and some anonymous authors dealing with civil rights, the Cuban Revolution, election songs of the 1940s, labor, pacifism, and war. Included are traditional folksongs and some of more recent vintage.

Music magazines published in the United States
Quarterly magazines published in the United States
Folk music magazines
Magazines established in 1946
Magazines disestablished in 1950
Music organizations based in the United States
Non-profit organizations based in New York City
Musical groups established in 1945
Woody Guthrie
Defunct magazines published in the United States
Magazines published in New York City